Rolling road may refer to:

Rolling Road, a major road in Maryland, USA
In rail transport rolling road, refers to trucks carried on trains for part of their journey. See rolling highway
Rolling Road (VRE station), train station on the Manassas Line, Virginia Railway Express, USA
The Rolling Road, a 1927 British film
Rolling road, a term sometimes used for a chassis dynamometer
The Rolling English Road, a poem by  G. K. Chesterton